House of Terror is a suspense film involving deception and a murder plot. It was directed by Sergei Goncharoff, and which starred Jennifer Bishop, Arell Blanton, Jacquelyn Hyde and William Kerwin. It was nominated in 1973 for a Saturn Award for Best Horror Film.

Plot
Directed by Sergei Goncharoff, this film was released around 1972/1973. Jennifer Bishop plays Jennifer Andrews, a nurse who is hired to look after a man's unstable and ill wife. Nurse Andrews has an ex-con former boyfriend who is after the woman's money. After the woman dies, Nurse Andrews marries the dead woman's husband. The ex-con boyfriend has plans to get hold of the money. After the woman's death the nurse and her boyfriend search for the dead woman's money but something isn't quite right, and it may be after them.

Release
The film was released VHS by Trans World Entertainment (TWE). It also appears to have had Beta release around 1987.
It was released on DVD by Retro Media in 2012

The film is also known as The Five at the Funeral, and has been screened in U.S. cinemas under that title. Another title is Scream Bloody Murder.

Cast
 Jennifer Bishop
 Arell Blanton
 Mitchell Gregg
 Irene Byatt
 Ernie Charles
 Jacquelyn Hyde
 William Kerwin

Crew
Director Sergei Goncharoff was also the producer of the 1985 film Walking the Edge which starred Robert Forster.
The art direction for the film was by Phedon Papamichael, Sr. whose son is Phedon Papamichael.

Crew list
 Director - Sergei Goncharoff 
 Screenplay - Tony Crechales, E.A. Charles 
 Music - Jaime Mendoza-Nava
 Cinematographer - Robert Maxwell
 Editor - Hanya Roman 
 Art direction - Phedon Papamichael
 Costume designer - Barbara Kerwin 
 Makeup - Nora Maxwell
 Production manager - Betsy Paullada
 Second unit director - John 'Bud' Cardos
 Boom man - Chic Borland 
 Sound editor - Irwin Cadden 
 Sound mixer - Clark Will 
 Grip - Ron Batzdorff
 First assistant camera - Ken Gibb
 Gaffer - Skip Karnas 
 Best boy - Vossa Leach
 Wardrobe - Frances Dennis
 Composer: additional music - George J. Gade 
 Musical director - Jaime Mendoza-Nava
 Production assistant - Tony Crechales
 Script supervisor - Elizabeth Leach

References

External links
 Imdb: House of Terror
 Rosk Shock Pop: House Of Terror
 Horrorpedia: House of Terror

1970s English-language films